Emmanuel Perrotin (born in May 1968 in Montreuil) is the French contemporary art gallery owner of Galerie Perrotin.

Early life and education
Emmanuel Perrotin is the son of Michel Perrotin, a bank employee, and Odile Pradinas, a stay-at-home mother. He grew up in L'Étang-la-Ville and attended the Lycée autogéré de Paris. While there, he found a part-time job making interactive slideshows for the Cité des Sciences et de l'Industrie and the Musée d'Orsay. He made his first art connections as a middle-school dropout at age 16, when he met the daughter of Gilbert Brownstone, a gallery owner, at Les Bains-Douches nightclub.

Career
By the age of 17, Perrotin was working as an assistant in a gallery opened by a wealthy British-Swedish art lover, Charles Cartwright, who represented artists like Marina Abramović and Alighiero Boetti. Four years later in 1989, he opened his own at the age of 21 in his flat in the 3rd arrondissement of Paris. During the day, he shared it with Hedi Slimane, then an unknown designer, who used it as a showroom. In 1991, when he was 23, he staged Damien Hirst's first commercial show. He has since worked closely with his roster of artists, some for more than 25 years, to help fulfill their ambitious projects. Among them, Maurizio Cattelan, Takashi Murakami, Jean-Michel Othoniel, Xavier Veilhan, or Sophie Calle.

In 2005, the gallery moved to an 18th-century mansion (76 rue de Turenne) and expanded itself at the 10 impasse Saint-Claude. In 2014, Perrotin opened a 700 square meters (7,500 square feet) showroom known as "La Salle de Bal", a former Ballroom in the Hôtel d'Ecquevilly named "du Grand Veneur", a 17th-century hôtel particulier. In its entirety, the Parisian spaces amount to approximately 2,300 square meters (25,000 square feet). In June 2020, Perrotin opens a space totaling 70 square meters (750 sq. ft.) on Avenue Matignon in the west of Paris. In their entirety, the Parisian spaces amount to 2,370 square meters (25,500 sq. ft.).

In 2012, Perrotin opened the Hong Kong gallery on the 17th floor of 50 Connaught Road Central, overlooking Victoria Harbour. Its surface area is 650 square meter (7,000 square feet). At the time, Perrotin was one of the first foreign galleries to open a space in the city. In 2020, the Hong Kong gallery moved across the harbor to K11 ATELIER Victoria Dockside on the Tsim Sha Tsui waterfront.

From 2013 to 2016, Perrotin New York was housed in a historic building on the Upper East Side's iconic Madison Avenue. After three years, Perrotin expanded in April 2017 to a 2,300 square meter (25,000 square feet) space and relocated to 130 Orchard Street in the Lower East Side.

In 2016, Perrotin inaugurated a new gallery in Seoul as well as a bookshop displaying unique editions and books published by the gallery. Located in the heart of the museum and galleries district, on the first and third floors of 5 Palpan-gil building, Jongno-gu district, the gallery is in close proximity to the National Museum of Modern & Contemporary Art and Daelim Museum and just in front of the Blue House/President's residence and Gyeongbok Palace.

In June 2017, Perrotin opened a space in Tokyo on the ground floor of the Piramide building at 6-6-9 Roppongi Minato-ku Tokyo. The 130 square meters (1,400 square feet) gallery is located in the center of the Roppongi area, a cultural and vibrant neighborhood, which gathers a large number of museums, including the Mori Art Museum, Suntory Museum of Art, National Art Center (Art Triangle Roppongi), and many well-established galleries. In 2019 the gallery expanded, and it now totals 230 square meters (2,500 sq. ft.) of exhibition space in Tokyo.

In 2018, Perrotin launched a new gallery in Shanghai, located in the heart of Shanghai's Bund quarter. Perrotin Shanghai occupies the top floor of a historic three-storey brick building (27 Huqiu Road) known as "Amber Building", built in 1937. Of a 1,200 square meter area (12,900 square feet), the gallery will include several exhibition rooms as well as a mezzanine, highlighting original elements of the building.
 
From 2022, Perrotin opened his secondary home in Cap Ferret to painter GaHee Park and sculptor Genesis Belanger and has since been operating a residency programs for the artists represented by his gallery.

Artists
The following artists are represented by Galerie Emmanuel Perrotin:

In the past, the gallery has worked with the following artists and estates: 
 Kaws (2008–2019)

Recognition
In April 2018, Perrotin accompanied President Emmanuel Macron on a state visit to Washington. In this capacity, he also attended the White House state dinner.

In 2018, the French culture minister, Françoise Nyssen, made Perrotin an officer the Ordre des Arts et des Lettres.

Controversy
When the Tripostal art space in Lille staged "Happy Birthday Galerie Perrotin" in 2013, a show examining the 25-year history of Galerie Perrotin, this was criticized as an overly "direct overture" the city made to a major art market player.

References

External links
Galerie Emmanuel Perrotin

Living people
1968 births
French art dealers
Art gallery owners